Marcelino Pecson Crisólogo (11 November 1844 – 5 July 1927), also known as Mena Crisólogo, was a Filipino politician, poet, writer and playwright.  He was known for being one of the representatives for Ilocos Sur in the Malolos Congress and being of one of the signatories of the Malolos Constitution. Born in Vigan, he became the first governor of Ilocos Sur and he popularized Ilocano art and literature.  As a dramatist, he wrote a zarzuela entitled Codigo Municipal.  One of his works, Mining wenno Ayat ti Kararwa is comparable to Noli me tangere, a novel by Philippine patriot José Rizal.  He translated Don Quixote into the Ilocano language as Don Calixtofaro de la Kota Caballero de la Luna.

In 1904, Crisólogo also took part in the Louisiana Purchase Exposition at St. Louis, Missouri, United States as one of delegation of governors.  He continued writing comedies and zarzuelas and promoting Ilocano art and literature after the end of his term as governor.

Being one of the most respected Ilocanos, one of the streets of Vigan City was named after him.  The heart of Vigan City, a designated UNESCO World Heritage Site, is the half-kilometer Calle Crisologo or Mena Crisologo Street.

References

1927 deaths
1844 births
Governors of Ilocos Sur
20th-century Filipino poets
Members of the House of Representatives of the Philippines from Ilocos Sur
People from Vigan
Filipino translators
Filipino male poets
Members of the Malolos Congress
20th-century male writers